Barigarh is a town and a nagar panchayat, Chhatarpur district, in the state of Madhya Pradesh, India.

Demographics
 India census, Barigarh had a population of 8,589. Males constitute 54% of the population and females 46%. Barigarh has an average literacy rate of 50%, lower than the national average of 59.5%; with 65% of the males and 35% of females literate. 19% of the population is under 6 years of age.

References

Bundelkhand
Chhatarpur